The 2020–21 FIBA Europe Cup was the sixth season of the FIBA Europe Cup, a European professional basketball competition for clubs, that was launched by FIBA. The season started on 26 January 2021 as it was delayed due to the COVID-19 pandemic.

Ironi Nes Ziona won its first European title, after defeating Stal Ostrów Wielkopolski in the final in Tel Aviv.

Effects of the COVID-19 pandemic
On 16 June 2020, FIBA Europe announced the season is presumed to start in September or October, with or without spectators. In case that the competition cannot start in September–October it will be automatically postponed to January 2021, with a reduced competition system.

On 2 September 2020, FIBA Europe announced the season will begin on 6 January 2021.

Team allocation
Maximum 27 teams will play in the 2020–21 FIBA Europe Cup. The 16 teams directly qualified and at most 11 of the teams eliminated in the  Basketball Champions League qualification rounds will join directly the regular season.

The teams are to be divided into seven groups. Groups of three and four teams will be formed.

Teams registered were officially published on 12 August 2020.

Draw will be on August 18.
Based on a decision of the Board of FIBA Europe, club from Russia (Parma) and clubs from Ukraine (Dnipro (if will not qualify for Champions League Regular season), Kyiv Basket, Prometey) will be drawn in separate groups in the Draw for the Regular Season.

Teams
1st, 2nd, etc.: Place in the domestic competition
Abd: Season abandoned due to the COVID-19 pandemic

Applicants

The following 4 teams chose the option of ending their continental adventure if they were eliminated from the Champions League qualifying rounds and therefore refuse to participate in the FIBA Europe Cup:

  Igokea
  Hapoel Tel Aviv
  Neptūnas
  U-BT Cluj Napoca

Round and draw dates
The schedule of the competition is as follows.

System competition
Regular Season to be played in single venue hubs in single round-robin format from January 26–29, 2021.
The top two clubs from each Regular Season group, plus the four best 3rd placed clubs, to advance to the Round of 16.
The Round of 16 pairings to be determined by a draw, with all six group winners and the two best 2nd placed clubs seeded and the other qualified teams not seeded; clubs from the same Regular Season group cannot be drawn against each other.
Round of 16 and Quarter-Finals to be played in single elimination games in four single venue hubs of four teams each, as per the Play-Off bracket, from March 23–25, 2021.
Final Four to be played in a single venue hub from April 23–25, 2021.

Regular season

Group A
Venue: Maaspoort in 's-Hertogenbosch, Netherlands

Group B
Venue: Arena Samokov in Samokov, Bulgaria

Group C
Venue: Hala Mistrzów in Włocławek, Poland

Group D
Venue: Akatlar Arena in Istanbul, Turkey

Group E
Venue: Hala Mistrzów in Włocławek, Poland

Group F
Venue: Maaspoort in 's-Hertogenbosch, Netherlands

Ranking of third-placed teams

Play-offs
All games are to be played in a single-elimination format.

Draw 
The playoffs draw will take place in the FIBA Europe Regional Office headquarters in Munich, Germany on Wednesday, February 3 at 14:00 CET and will be made with the restriction that teams from the same Regular Season group cannot be drawn against each other.

Bracket
The hub locations of the round of 16 and quarterfinals were announced on 25 February.

Individual awards

Top Performer

See also
2020–21 Basketball Champions League
2020–21 EuroLeague
2020–21 EuroCup Basketball

References

External links
Official website

 
FIBA Europe Cup
 
Basketball events postponed due to the COVID-19 pandemic